The California Arts Council is a state agency based in Sacramento, United States. Its eight council members are appointed by the Governor and the state Legislature. The agency's mission is to advance California through arts, culture and creativity.

History
The California Arts Council was established in 1976 and signed into law by Governor Jerry Brown, who dissolved the existing 15-member California Arts Commission, which had been in existence since 1963. Brown appointed Eloise Pickard Smith as the Council's first director. Smiith established Arts in Corrections, which is still an active branch of the Council as of 2022.

Purpose of state arts agencies
When Congress created the National Endowment for the Arts (NEA) in 1965, it required the NEA to apportion funds to any state that established an arts agency. The given reason was that arts agencies increase public access to the arts and work to ensure that every community in America enjoys the cultural, civic, economic and educational benefits of a thriving arts sector.

To do this, according to the National Assembly of State Arts Agencies, state arts agencies:
 provide grant funding for artists, arts institutions, schools and community groups,
 offer training and information that strengthens the management and entrepreneurial skills of artists and arts organizations,
 support art activities for young people, both in and out of schools,
 lead initiatives to foster economic and civic development through the arts,
 advance arts education through teacher training, curriculum development and assessment projects,
 conduct research that documents the impact of the arts,
 educate the public about the role of the arts in American life,
 preserve and celebrate the cultural traditions of each state,
 recognize and promote artistic achievement.

All 50 states and the six U.S. jurisdictions (American Samoa, District of Columbia, Guam, Northern Marianas, Puerto Rico, and the U.S. Virgin Islands) have state arts agencies. The NEA is required by law to allocate 40% of its grant funds to states and regions. State arts agencies, including the California Arts Council, use these dollars to leverage matching funds, to address local needs, and to expand the reach and impact of federal arts funding across the country.

Budget
Although the structure of state arts agencies anticipated that the bulk of their funding would come from annual or biennial appropriations from state legislatures, in California that has not always been the case. Funding of the California Arts Council has followed the general fiscal trends in the state.

The California Arts Council’s biggest budget was $32 million in 2000-01. During the budget crisis of 2003-2004, the California Arts Council lost 94% of its funding from the state legislature, resulting in deep cuts to arts council programs and staff. California currently ranks 37th in state arts funding per capita, spending 46 cents for each California resident in support of the arts. However, the California Arts Council receives revenue from two income streams that are not dependent on allocation of tax dollars: the Arts License Plate and voluntary contributions, both of which the Franchise Tax Board deems tax-deductible as charitable contributions to the California Arts Council. For the 2017-18 fiscal year, the Arts Council received a permanent budget increase of $6.8 million, a $750,000 ongoing allocation to directly support increased arts programming California's juvenile justice system, as well as an additional $2 million increased allocation for California's Arts in Corrections program.

Arts license plate
In 1994, through special legislation, the California Arts Council and the California Department of Motor Vehicles began offering the first license plate in the United States to directly benefit the arts. The image on the plate, Coastline, was created by California artist Wayne Thiebaud, who retains copyright to the image but gifted its use to the California Arts Council for the production of the Arts License Plate. The license plate is available to California car owners, supports arts education and local arts programming.

Voluntary tax contribution (Keep Arts in Schools Fund)
In 2010, the legislature passed SB 1076 by Senator Curren Price, and Governor Arnold Schwarzenegger signed it into law. The California Arts Council was included on the 2010 and 2011 "Voluntary Contribution" portion of the state tax form. By choosing "Arts Council Fund" and indicating the amount they wish to contribute, individual taxpayers were able to make tax-deductible contributions in amounts of $1 or more. This option was removed for 2012 because the Arts Council Fund did not achieve the $250,000 goal specified in the enabling legislation.

In 2013 the legislature passed SB 571, written by Senator Curren D. Price, at that time Chair of the Joint Committee on the Arts. Authorship was assumed by Senator Carol Liu when Senator Price was elected to the Los Angeles City Council in early 2013. Governor Jerry Brown signed it into law in September 2013. The bill returned the California Arts Council to the voluntary contribution portion of California tax return forms through the "Keep Arts in Schools Fund," which first appeared on California tax returns in 2014. During the California Arts Council's 2016-2017 fiscal year, the Keep Arts in Schools Fund brought in $250,000.

The California Arts Council today
Arts Council members and staff come from many walks of life and have experience in the arts, creative industries, arts education, community development, state and local government, and the nonprofit and for-profit sectors of California's economy. As a state agency, the California Arts Council encourages public participation in the arts in the state, helps build arts organizations at the local level, assists with the professional development of arts leaders, promotes awareness of the value of the arts, and directly funds arts programs for California citizens. The California Arts Council assists in locating artists and artists' estates that are due money under California's Resale Royalty Act (California Civil Code Section 986), and distributes these royalties when artists are found. The Resale Royalty Act was declared unconstitutional in 2012. On July 6, 2018, a panel of the Ninth Circuit ruled that California’s Resale Royalties Act only applies to art sales conducted prior to 1978.

References

External links
California Arts Council website

 
Organizations based in Sacramento, California
Government agencies established in 1976
1976 establishments in California